is a Japanese actor and model. He debuted as Takeru Shiba/Shinken Red  in Samurai Sentai Shinkenger. Since then, he has appeared in several television shows and films.

Personal life
On December 10, 2020, Matsuzaka married actress Erika Toda, his co-star in the 2015 film April Fools.

Filmography

TV series

Film

Stage

Japanese dub

Photobooks
 TAO (October 25, 2011)

Awards

Film

Magazines
Fineboys
SJ STREET and Takei Emi
FINEBOYS
CEDAR CREST
Audition
Puma Meets 
Koi.Men
GC
ACTORS Magazine
Shibuya 109 MEN'S!

CFs
 GHANNA
 ACUO
 Lotte (2012)

References

External links
 Official profile 
 

1988 births
Living people
People from Chigasaki, Kanagawa
Japanese male models
21st-century Japanese male actors
Japanese male television actors
Japanese male film actors
Japanese male stage actors